The Gleaner Manufacturing Company (aka: Gleaner Combine Harvester Corp.) is an American manufacturer of combine harvesters. Gleaner (or Gleaner Baldwin) has been a popular brand of combine harvester particularly in the Midwestern United States for many decades, first as an independent firm, and later as a division of Allis-Chalmers. The Gleaner brand continues today under the ownership of AGCO.

History 

Gleaner combines date from 1923, when the Baldwin brothers of Nickerson, Kansas, created a high-quality and reliable self-propelled combine harvester. They decided to use the "Gleaner" name for their radically redesigned grain harvesting machine based on inspiration from "The Gleaners", an 1857 painting by Jean-François Millet. Gleaning is the act of collecting leftover crops from farm fields after they have been commercially harvested, or on fields where it is not economically profitable to harvest. In the broadest sense, it is the act of frugally recovering resources from low-yield contexts. Thus, with the Gleaner name, the company evoked a positive connotation in potential customers' minds, of a brand of harvester that would leave none of the grain behind. A combine harvester combines the reaping (plus or minus binding), threshing, and winnowing functions into one machine, hence the "combine" part of its name. To that list, the Baldwin brothers' Gleaner added self-propulsion. Earlier combines, the so-called pull-type or tractor-drawn combines, were towed by tractors.

First design 
The original Gleaner design was mounted on a Fordson Model F. It had a retail price of USD $950 FOB at the factory in Nickerson. This design was manufactured between 1923 and 1928.

Pull-types 
From 1928 until 1954, Gleaner produced pull-type combine harvesters of both large and small sizes.  The large models were intended for throughput and were the favored types for customer harvesters, while the small models were made for smaller, single-farm operations. Early "Gleaner-Baldwin" combines used the Ford Model A engine. The Gleaner Baldwin Model A, built from 1930 to 1935, was so equipped, as were later Gleaner Models, the NA and NR, until 1938. The combine's Model A engine was mounted on a frame fitted for the radiator, and was coupled to a power take-off unit.

First in self-propelled 
The Gleaner was one of the pioneers in self-propelled combines. They were often considered the "Cadillac" of the industry because of this feature and because of their solid engineering. Buescher (1991) credited the design principally to one of the brothers, Curt Baldwin, and explained that it focused on the needs of custom cutters like the Baldwin brothers themselves: contractors who move north with the harvest season, providing harvesting services to farmers. It resulted in machines that were reliable and useful, which benefited not only custom cutters but anyone who bought a Gleaner. The short wheelbase and axle track allowed the combine to fit on a truck. The grain header did not need to be detached for transit, because it fit over the cab of the truck. Buescher said, "Since custom cutters didn't know where their next parts supply source would be, Baldwin designed his combine so that it wouldn't need parts." (Buescher's tongue-in-cheek point is that the machines were designed and built well so that need for repairs would be minimal.) The frame was "like a bridge" in its strength. The bearings were chosen with service in mind: large and good quality (to obviate failure) and of common sizes (so that the operator could carry a small stock of spares in his truck, and have the size needed when a replacement became necessary). The Gleaner's exterior sheet metal was galvanized (zinc plated), providing superior weather resistance. As Buescher said, "Baldwin reasoned that most of his combines would sit outdoors. Texas and Oklahoma dust storms have a way of peeling paint off of machinery." As a result of the silver color of the zinc plating, the Gleaner brand ended up having a distinctive color (just as Allis had Persian Orange, IH had red, and John Deere had green), despite the sheet metal not even having any paint.

1930s 
During the Great Depression, owing mostly to the collapse of the farm economy and the Dust Bowl, the Baldwins' company entered bankruptcy in the 1930s as equipment sales plummeted. William James Brace acquired the company with his son-in-law, George Reuland. The pair, along with other investors, brought the company back to profitability and maintained ownership until 1955. During World War II, the factory converted its production to war materiel.

1940s and 1950s 
By the late 1940s and early 1950s, other farm equipment manufacturers were offering increased competition to Gleaner, having introduced their own versions of self-propelled combines.

In 1955, Allis-Chalmers acquired Gleaner. This represented commercial renewal for Gleaner with the production and marketing success of various new models and technologies. It also represented a great gain for Allis-Chalmers. Allis was the market leader in pull-type (tractor-drawn) combines, with its All-Crop Harvester line. Acquiring Gleaner meant that it would also be a leader in self-propelled machines, and it would own two of the leading brands in combines. The Gleaner line augmented (and later superseded) the All-Crop Harvester line, and for several years Gleaner's profits made up nearly all of Allis-Chalmers' profit. Gleaners continued to be manufactured at the same factory, in Independence, Missouri, after the acquisition.

1970s–1990 
In 1979, Gleaner released its first rotary combine, the N6. It was soon followed by the N5 and N7.

In 1985, Allis-Chalmers sold their farm machinery manufacturing business to Deutz AG and became known as Deutz-Allis, and in 1991 its North American operations became AGCO. Despite several ownership changes, the Gleaner brand never ceased to be produced or marketed. Between 1985 and 2000, Gleaner lost significant market share to other manufacturers with broader dealer bases and farm equipment product lines that had marketing and customer service advantages. Another problem for Gleaner was that some of their combines used the air-cooled Deutz engine, a departure from water-cooled engines predominantly found in most other industrial and agricultural applications.

2000–present 
In 2000, AGCO moved the Gleaner manufacturing operations from Independence, Missouri to its Hesston, Kansas facility, which featured modernized manufacturing equipment and techniques. It also centralized the engineering and production functions into one location. The Hesston facility is 35 miles east of Nickerson, Kansas, where the Baldwin brothers started the Gleaner company in 1923.

For the period of 2007-2010, Gleaner offered the A5 and A6 models which featured an axial processor (rotor) rather than the signature transverse rotor.  This was done as a marketing move by AGCO to use the strength of the Gleaner name to attract new customers to the axial machine which was more heavily produced as the Challenger 500x series and the Massey Ferguson 95xx series combines.  The Gleaner A series production ceased after 2010 and the Challenger and Massey Ferguson machines ceased production in 2017.

Firsts 
Some of the firsts introduced by the Gleaner were: an auger that replaced canvas drapers, a rasp bar threshing cylinder instead of a spike-tooth arrangement, and a down-front cylinder that put threshing closer to the crop. In 1972 Gleaner was the first manufacturer to use electro-hydraulic controls, an innovation that other companies didn't offer until nearly two decades later. Gleaner was also the first in the industry to offer a 12 row corn head in 1979.

Gleaner also explored use of turbocharged diesel engines before the competition. Records from October 1962 list the 262-cubic-inch turbo-diesel engine as being available for the model "C".

Another Gleaner innovation was a "rock door" to protect the machine from damage due to stones that it might pick up while harvesting.  If a Gleaner combine ingests a rock, the rock door simply pops open and drops the stone on the ground, preventing damage to the cylinder and concave bars, unlike other machines with a "rock trap" that the operator must periodically clean out or dump.

A current Gleaner and world first is that they created the first Class VIII transverse rotor combine. This happened when AGCO introduced the new Gleaner S88 series combine in 2014.  Also during this year of manufacturing, a 7-cylinder 9.8L diesel engine, built by AGCO Sisu (Later AGCO POWER), was first used in the S78 and S88 models.

In 2016, with the release of the S9 series, came a completely new cab as well as the first use of a "fly-by-wire" hydrostatic transmission in a Gleaner combine, meaning the propulsion of the machine as controlled by operator no longer used a direct cable interface and was now achieved strictly by electronic feedback into a transmission control module.

Today 
Gleaners are still in production under AGCO.  The Gleaner brand is marketed in North America, South America, and Australia.

The current models available for sale, first released in 2016 and still in full production, are the S96, S97, and S98, which are Class VI, VII, and VIII combines, respectively.  These combines still utilize the transverse rotor which was originally introduced in 1979.

Self-Propelled Models 
Here is a list of Gleaner Combine models built from 1951 to present.

References

Bibliography

External links 
 
 AGCO Corporation Gleaner Brand Page
 Official Twitter Page - Gleaner Combines

Agricultural machinery manufacturers of the United States
Manufacturing companies established in 1923
AGCO
1923 establishments in Kansas